"When We Disco" is a song recorded by South Korean singer-songwriters J. Y. Park and Sunmi. Written and composed by Park, it was released as a digital single on August 12, 2020 by JYP Entertainment. The song was featured at "J.Y. Park Best" album, with a Japanese version as bonus track.

Background and release
At a restaurant, after hearing a song that she used to listen to in New York with J. Y. Park when Wonder Girls were touring the United States with him, Sunmi sent a recording of the song to her former boss to reminisce about the past. J. Y. Park answered her message by sending her a demo of his song, asking her "if she missed the days [they] worked together" and suggesting a collaboration. At this point, he had almost completed writing the lyrics.

On July 24, 2020, it was reported that J. Y. Park would release a new song in August and that all recordings had been completed. On August 3, a teaser poster announcing Park and Sunmi's collaboration scheduled to be released on August 12 was posted on JYP Entertainment's twitter account and retweeted by both singers. On August 6, J. Y. Park shared a teaser for the music video on his Instagram account. A second teaser was released on YouTube the following day. On August 10, both singers shared the online cover image for the song. The single was released on August 12.

Composition
J. Y. Park was inspired by Modern Talking's song "Brother Louie" which serves as the opening song for the South Korean talk show Radio Star and was stuck in his head at the time; it took him a few hours to complete the song. Park said to have used "typical instruments of the European disco genre and recorded with the equipment imbued with 80s vibes to fully recreate nostalgic melody."

Music video
The song's accompanying music video was released on August 11, 2020 at 6:00 PM (KST), one day prior to the single's release. It was inspired by the American films Saturday Night Fever (1977) and Pulp Fiction (1994) which J. Y. Park loves, as mentioned at the end of the video.

Riddhi Chakraborty of Rolling Stone India described the music video to have "a late-Seventies, early-Eighties vibe, reviving the Saturday Night Fever era with its multi-coloured dance floor, hazy club setting, glimmering disco ball and glitzy wardrobe and makeup. Park and Sunmi play lovers who are parted in their youth but are fated to meet again 10 years later, fighting gangsters and all odds to be together and celebrate their love for each other and for disco."

The music video reached 2.32 million views in 24 hours, a new record for J. Y. Park. It surpassed 10 million views 4 days and 22 hours after its release.

Critical reception
Jason Lipshutz of Billboard said that the song "showcases both of [J. Y. Park and Sunmi's] vocal talents above sparkling synth lines."

Chart performance
After its release, the single quickly topped the real-time music charts Naver Music, Genie Music and Bugs.

Credits and personnel
Credits adapted from Genie Music. Recorded at JYPE Studio.

 J. Y. Park – lead vocals, songwriter, composer, arranger 
 Sunmi – lead vocals
 Lee Hae-sol – arranger
 Ham Chun-ho – guitar
 Lee Tae-yoon – bass
 Kim Hyo-kook – keyboard
 Kim Hyo-soo – background vocals
 Lee Sang-yeob – recording
 Tony Maserati – mixing
 Chris Gehringer – mastering

Charts

Accolades

Release history

References

2020 songs
2020 singles
Korean-language songs
Sunmi songs
Songs written by Park Jin-young